Psekups may refer to:
Psekups (river), a river in the Republic of Adygea, Russia
Psekups (rural locality), a rural locality (a khutor) in the Republic of Adygea, Russia